The Sagnes de la Godivelle National Nature Reserve is a natural reserve located in La Godivelle, France. It was created on June 27, 1975 and is made up of 24 hectares of wetland habitats.

Geography of Puy-de-Dôme
Nature reserves in France
Protected areas established in 1975
Tourist attractions in Puy-de-Dôme
Auvergne-Rhône-Alpes region articles needing translation from French Wikipedia